Mirolyubovo is a rural locality in Verkhnekhotemlsky Selsoviet Rural Settlement, Fatezhsky District, Kursk Oblast, Russia. The population as of 2010 is 382.

Geography 
The village is located on the Verkhny Khoteml Brook (a link tributary of the Usozha in the basin of the Svapa), 102 km from the Russia–Ukraine border, 41.5 km north-west of Kursk, 3.5 km south-west of the district center – the town Fatezh, 5.5 km from the selsoviet center – Verkhny Khoteml.

Climate
Mirolyubovo has a warm-summer humid continental climate (Dfb in the Köppen climate classification).

Transport 
Mirolyubovo is located 1.5 km from the federal route  Crimea Highway as part of the European route E105, 4 km from the road of regional importance  (Fatezh – Dmitriyev), on the road of intermunicipal significance  (M2 "Crimea Highway" – Mirolyubovo), 33 km from the nearest railway station Vozy (railway line Oryol – Kursk).

The rural locality is situated 44.5 km from Kursk Vostochny Airport, 163 km from Belgorod International Airport and 234 km from Voronezh Peter the Great Airport.

References

Notes

Sources

Rural localities in Fatezhsky District